Ratitovec is a mountain ridge in the Julian Alps in Slovenia. The highest peak on the ridge is Mount Altemaver. The Krek Lodge stands on the ridge.

Name
Ratitovec was attested in historical sources as Boscana in AD 973 and as Petschana in 1763–87 (both corresponding to the Pečana mountain pasture on the north slope of the ridge), as well as Ratitovecz and Rakitovez in the second half of the eighteenth century. The name Ratitovec developed from Rakitovec via assimilation at a distance and is based on the common noun rakita 'eared willow', referring to the local vegetation.

Starting points and routes
 From Soriška planina, 3h
 From the village of Prtovč, 2h
 From the village of Torka via Povden, 1½h
 From Bitenjska planina on Jelovica 2½h
 From Planina pečana, 1h

References

External links
 
 Route description 
 Ratitovec on Hribi.net
 Železniki Hiking Club

Mountains of the Julian Alps
Triglav National Park
One-thousanders of Slovenia